Oliver Stratford Tomkins (9 June 190829 October 1992) was an Anglican Bishop of Bristol in the third quarter of the 20th century.

Early life and education
Born into an ecclesiastical family – his father was Leopold Charles Fellows Tomkins (a priest) – Tomkins was educated at Trent College and Christ's College, Cambridge.

Ecclesiastical career
He was made a deacon on Michaelmas 1935 (29 September) and ordained a priest the Michaelmas following (20 September 1936) — both times by Henry Wilson, Bishop of Chelmsford, at Chelmsford Cathedral, after which he was assistant curate of St Mary, Prittlewell. From 1940 to 1945, he was vicar of Holy Trinity, Millhouses. In 1945, he became Secretary of the World Council of Churches.  In 1952 he was appointed Warden of Lincoln Theological College and a Canon at Lincoln Cathedral.

Tomkins was appointed to the episcopate in 1959 as the Bishop of Bristol and consecrated a bishop on 6 January 1959, by Geoffrey Fisher, Archbishop of Canterbury, at Westminster Abbey; a post he held for 16 years until his retirement on 1 October 1975.

Bibliography
Tomkins was also an eminent author. His works included:
The Universal Church in God's Design (1948)
The Wholeness of the Church (1949)
The Church in the Purpose of God (1950)
Intercommunion (1951)
Life of E. S. Woods, Bishop of Lichfield (1957)
A Time for Unity (1964)
Guarded by Faith (1971)
Prayer for Unity (1987)

References

1908 births
People educated at Trent College
Alumni of Christ's College, Cambridge
20th-century Church of England bishops
Bishops of Bristol
1992 deaths
Staff of Lincoln Theological College